The Where Dreams Come True Tour was the second concert tour by Irish boy band Westlife seen by 600,000 fans making £12,000,000, in support of their second studio album, Coast to Coast. The tour was nicknamed "The No Stools Tour" due to the band's reputation of performing while perched on stools. Before this full-length world tour, they had a short tour within UK, Ireland and Southeast Asian countries.

A Coast to Coast Itinerary was made as a tour programme with original 63-page A5 sized spiral-bound tour itinerary book for 1 February to 31 March UK tour. It lists the band possibly doing 10 nights at Wembley Arena. Includes details on tour dates & venues, Crew & Band member listing, hotel & travel arrangements for both band & crew and more, complete with the original front colour cover and front clear protective cover laminate.

This would have only been issued to crew/people involved with the tour, and were not for sale to the general public. In most cases less than 100 copies were ever made.

Support Act
 Reel
 Bellefire
 Masai
 Fixate
 Christian Wunderlich
 GrannySmiths
 Anna Fegi
 Trademark
 Cool Colors

Setlist
"Dreams Come True"
"No No"
"If I Let You Go"
"Swear It Again"
"Somebody Needs You"
"Seasons in the Sun"
"I Have a Dream"
"You Make Me Feel"
"When You're Looking Like That"
"My Love"
Medley:
"More Than Words"
"My Girl"
"I Can't Get Next to You"
"Ain't Too Proud to Beg"
"Baby I Need Your Loving"
"What Becomes of the Brokenhearted"
"Fool Again"
"Uptown Girl"
"What Makes a Man"
"I Lay My Love on You"
"Flying Without Wings"

Tour dates

Box office score data

Album and video

A live concert DVD of the tour was released later that same year.

The DVD contained several bonus materials such as an Access All Areas documentary, a World of Our Own featurette, a link to an exclusive website and a music video of "When You're Looking Like That" in Dolby Digital 2.0 & 5.1 sound.

This was re-released in China into CD/DVD format. Release contains a free poster of the band and a booklet with the lyrics of the CD-songs translated to Chinese. With the same DVD track listing and bonus CD contains 5 live tracks from the same performance as the DVD:

"Fool Again"
"Uptown Girl"
"What Makes a Man"
"You Make Me Feel"
"Flying Without Wings"

Chart performance

Certifications

References

External links

Official Westlife Website

2001 concert tours
Westlife concert tours
Westlife video albums